Events from the year 1964 in France.

Incumbents
President: Charles de Gaulle 
Prime Minister: Georges Pompidou

Events
27 January – France and the People's Republic of China announce their decision to establish diplomatic relations.
11 February – The Republic of China (Taiwan) drops diplomatic relations with France because of French recognition of the People's Republic of China.
8-15 March – Cantonal elections held.
23 May – Mrs. Madeleine Dassault, 63, wife of French plane manufacturer and politician Marcel Dassault, is kidnapped while leaving her car in front of her Paris home; she is found unharmed the next day in a farmhouse 27 miles from Paris.

Sport
22 June – Tour de France begins.
14 July – Tour de France ends, won by Jacques Anquetil.

Births

January to March
6 January – Loïc Courteau, tennis player
7 January – Hervé Balland, cross-country skier
10 January – Claude Morinière, long jumper
11 January – Albert Dupontel, actor and film director
24 January – Gérald Passi, soccer player
1 February – Philippe Casado, cyclist (died 1995)
12 February – Stéphane Franke, athlete (died 2011)
14 February – Frédéric Delcourt, swimmer and Olympic medallist
17 February – Thierry Laurey, soccer player
27 February – Christian Penigaud, beach volleyball player
28 February – Pierre Hantaï, conductor and harpsichordist
1 March – Paul Le Guen, soccer manager
5 March – Bertrand Cantat, singer and songwriter
9 March – Juliette Binoche, actress
16 March – Franck Fréon, motor racing driver
24 March – Chantal Mauduit, alpinist (died 1998)
30 March – Christophe Robert, soccer player

April to June
2 April – Didier Tholot, soccer manager
14 April – Emmanuel Villaume, conductor
5 May – Jean-François Copé, politician
10 May – Emmanuelle Devos, actress
12 May – Pierre Morel, film director and cinematographer
23 May – Laurent Naouri, bass-baritone
27 May – Yves Caumon, film director
31 May – Stéphane Caristan, athlete
3 June – Jérôme Pradon, actor and singer
5 June – Jean-François Remésy, golfer
11 June – Jean Alesi, motor racing driver
12 June – Philippe Bouvatier, cyclist.
21 June – Patrice Bailly-Salins, biathlete and Olympic medallist
24 June – Philippe Fargeon, soccer player
27 June – Serge Le Dizet, soccer player, coach

July to September
1 July – Bernard Laporte, rugby union player and coach, Secretary of State for Sport
3 July – Yeardley Smith, voice actress
13 July – Pascal Hervé, cyclist
21 July – Fabrice Colas, cyclist
4 August – Sebastian Roché, actor
24 August – Éric Bernard, motor racing driver
September – Olivier Zahm, art critic, curator, fashion editor, and art director
2 September – Jean-Christophe Spinosi, conductor and violinist
14 September – Laurent Fournier, soccer player, manager
16 September – Nicolas Hénard, sailor and Olympic gold medallist

October to December
16 October – Jean-Christophe Thomas, soccer player
19 October – Agnès Jaoui, screenwriter, film director, actress and singer
8 December – Éric Aubijoux, motorcycle racer (died 2007)
8 December – Laurent Croci, soccer player
19 December – Béatrice Dalle, actress
24 December – Jean-Paul Civeyrac, film director
30 December – Pascal Baills, soccer player

Full date unknown
Éric Chevillard, novelist
Stéphane Cornicard, actor and director
Philippe Graffin, violinist and recording artist
Jean-Michel Othoniel, artist

Deaths

January to June
11 January – André-Damien-Ferdinand Jullien, cardinal (born 1882)
13 January – Pierre Yvert, philatelic editor (born 1900)
10 February – Paul Baudouin, banker and politician (born 1894)
15 February – Reginald Garrigou-Lagrange, Catholic theologian (born 1877)
17 February – Philippe Cattiau, fencer and Olympic gold medallist (born 1892)
25 February – Maurice Farman, motor racing driver, aviator, aircraft manufacturer and designer (born 1877)
17 May – Honoré Barthélemy, cyclist (born 1890)
30 May – René-Yves Creston, artist, designer and ethnographer (born 1898)
17 June – René Crabos, rugby union player (born 1899)

July to December
1 July – Pierre Monteux, conductor (born 1875)
7 July – Charles Bozon, alpine skier and world champion (born 1932)
11 July – Maurice Thorez, communist politician (born 1900)
21 July – Jean Fautrier, painter and sculptor (born 1898)
4 September – Clément-Emile Roques, cardinal (born 1880)
7 September – Georges Thierry d'Argenlieu, Admiral (born 1889)
9 September – Maurice Le Boucher, organist, composer, and pedagogue (born 1882)
20 September – Lazare Lévy, pianist, composer and teacher (born 1882)
27 October – Gabriel Benoist, writer (born 1891)
8 November – Fernand Baldet, astronomer (born 1885)
22 December – Paul Tournon, architect (born 1881)

Full date unknown
Georges Andrique, painter (born 1874).
Pierre Brissaud, illustrator, painter and engraver (born 1885)
Jean Dupas, painter, designer, poster artist and decorator (born 1882)

See also
 List of French films of 1964

References

1960s in France